Asia Carrera Lemmon (born Jessica Steinhauser, August 6, 1973) is an American former pornographic actress.

Early life
Asia Carrera was born Jessica Steinhauser in New York City to a German mother and Japanese father, the oldest of four siblings. She was raised on Lippincott Road in Little Silver, New Jersey, attending Red Bank Regional High School. She performed piano at Carnegie Hall at age 13 and 14. At the age of 16, she taught English at Tsuruga College in Tsuruga, Fukui, Japan.

Carrera won a National Merit Scholarship and scored over 1440 on the SAT, as well as a Garden State Scholarship for her grades. She attended Rutgers University on full academic scholarship, where she majored in Japanese and business, but did not graduate. Carrera is a member of Mensa, with an IQ of 156.

Career

Adult film career
Carrera's adult film career started in 1993. In 1995, she became the first Asian performer ever to win the AVN Female Performer of the Year Award. Carrera retired from the film industry in 2003, following her marriage to Don Lemmon.

Carrera lent her voice to several erotic hentai OVAs for publisher Pink Pineapple, such as Inmu (2001) and Shusaku (1999). In October 2001, Carrera attended the Big Apple Anime Fest in New York City for her voice roles and along with Kobe Tai was an Opening Night Guest of Honor at the fest's Midnight Anime Concourse.

Carrera was also in the 2012 documentary After Porn Ends, which documents the lives of actors after they leave the adult film industry. In the documentary, she discusses her membership in Mensa. Despite being a celebrity member of the group, the organization refused to link to her website because it contained pornographic elements.

Other work
In 1998, she appeared in an uncredited cameo role in the film The Big Lebowski in the faux pornographic movie Logjammin''' within the film.

Carrera was a guest reviewer for Maximum PC magazine.

Personal life

Carrera is an atheist. As of November 2014, she wore a colander on her head for her Utah driver's license photograph. State law normally prohibits the wearing of hats in driver license photos, but there is an exception for religious headwear and Carerra's colander was worn in honor of the religion of the Flying Spaghetti Monster. She is one of about a dozen "Pastafarian" Utahns who have worn a colander in their official state ID photos.

In September 1995, Carrera married adult film director Bud Lee. They divorced in 2003, but remain good friends. She married nutritionist and author Don Lemmon on December 19, 2003. The couple moved to St. George, Utah, where she gave birth to a daughter on March 4, 2005. On June 10, 2006, Lemmon was killed in a car accident outside of Las Vegas. Seven weeks later, on July 31, Carrera gave birth to the couple's second child. In June 2012, she gave birth to a boy whom she later placed for adoption.

In 2015, she was arrested for DUI with "a reported blood alcohol content of .254 percent – more than three times Utah’s .08 legal limit." She pleaded no contest in exchange for avoiding jail time and was sentenced to house arrest.

She identified investor Warren Buffett as her hero on her website, which Buffett was pleased to learn.

In 2017, Carrera began studies at Dixie State University with her daughter. At 11 years old, Carrera's daughter was the youngest student to ever attend college at Dixie State University and the youngest full-time college student in the state of Utah at the time.

Awards and nominations
 1995 AVN Female Performer of the Year
 2000 AVN Best Couples Sex Scene – Film (Search for the Snow Leopard'')
 2000 AVN Award nominee - Best Actress – Film
 2001 AVN Hall of Fame inductee
 2007 XRCO Hall of Fame inductee – XRCO Members' Choice

References

Citations

Sources
 Nakamura, Eric (1999). "Big Money Shot: Asia Carrera". Giant Robot. 
 Pollard, Nate (2011). "Interview: Asia Carrera". Verbicide.

External links

 
 
 
 
 

1973 births
Living people
Actresses from New York City
American women bloggers
American bloggers
American female adult models
American pornographic film actresses
American people of German descent
American pornographic film actors of Japanese descent
American film actors of Asian descent
People from Little Silver, New Jersey
People from St. George, Utah
Pornographic film actors from New Jersey
Pornographic film actors from New York (state)
Rutgers University alumni
American atheists
20th-century American actresses
21st-century American actresses
American actresses of Japanese descent
Red Bank Regional High School alumni
Mensans